Choi Jin-han is a South Korean former footballer and manager.

Honours

Player
Lucky-Goldstar Hwangso
 K League (2): 1985, 1990
 Korean National Football Championship (1): 1988

Manager
FC Seoul U-18
 Korean U-18 League (1): 2009

Individual
 K League MVP Award: 1990
 K League Best XI: 1990

Club career statistics

External links 

FC Seoul players
Jeju United FC players
K League 1 Most Valuable Player Award winners
K League 1 players
Association football midfielders
South Korea international footballers
South Korean footballers
1984 AFC Asian Cup players
Gyeongnam FC managers
Bucheon FC 1995 managers
People from Jinju
1961 births
Living people
Expatriate football managers in China
South Korean expatriate football managers
Sportspeople from South Gyeongsang Province
Myongji University alumni